Zehra Hanzade Sultan (12 September 1923 – 19 March 1998) was an Ottoman princess, the daughter of Şehzade Ömer Faruk, the son of last caliph of the Abdulmejid II and Şehsuvar Hanım. Her mother was Sabiha Sultan, daughter of Sultan Mehmed VI and Nazikeda Kadın.

Early life
Zehra Hanzade Sultan was born on 12 September 1923 in the Dolmabahçe Palace, nearly a year after the abolition of the Ottoman Empire. Her father was Şehzade Ömer Faruk, and her mother was Sabiha Sultan. She had an elder sister, Neslişah Sultan, two years elder then her and a younger sister, Necla Sultan, two years younger than her. She was the paternal granddaughter  of Abdulmejid II and Şehsuvar Hanım, and the maternal granddaughter of Sultan Mehmed VI and Nazikeda Kadın.

A month after her birth, Turkey became a republic on 29 October 1923. At the exile of the imperial family in March 1924, Hanzade her mother and sister left Turkey. The three of them left the mansion in Rumelihisarı on 11 March, and took the Orient Express to join her father and grandfather in Switzerland.  Later, her parents and sisters moved to Nice, France where she spent her childhood. In fall of 1938, she arrived with her sister and father in Alexandria, Egypt. Their grandfather, Abdulmejid used to take her and her sister Neslişah to seashore during special occasions.

Marriage
In 1940, Prince Muhammad Abdel Moneim sent a proposal to Neslişah Sultan, as he was willing to marry her. Neslişah didn't agree and relations between her and father got cold, following which she agreed. Hanzade's family was impoverished because of the ongoing World War II, as their grandfather Abdulmejid was unable to send them money from France. And because of this she wanted to marry, and get out of the situation immediately. However, her father disagreed and initially said "The eldest marries first, then the younger ones, let Neslişah then we will be thinking about Hanzade".

However, later, Faruk changed his mind and chose Prince Muhammed Ali Ibrahim as husband for her. The wedding was situated in Cairo, and the family stayed Aziza Hanım's home at Al-Qubba. Prince Muhammed Ali rented a large house in Gezira, which also had a library with beautifully bonded books. The wedding took place on Thursday, 19 September 1940, as Thursday was considered a felicitous day for marriage in Egypt. The next week on Thursday, 26 September 1940 the wedding of Neslişah Sultan and Prince Abdel Moniem took place.

The couple's first child Sabiha Fazile Hanımsultan was born on 8 August 1941. She was followed by Sultanzade Ahmed Rifat, born on 31 August 1942. In 1958, King Faisal II of Iraq send a proposal for Fazile. The proposal was a surprise for her parents because, Fazile was only sixteen and was studying in school. However, the marriage was not held because of the king's murder in the same year in 14 July revolution. Fazile later married Hayri Ürgüplu, in Paris on 10 December 1965, the son of Suat Hayri Ürgüplü, who served as Turkey's Prime Minister for seven months. Hanzade lived in Egypt until 1952, the Egyptian revolution of 1952 took place on 23 July 1952, and Egypt was proclaimed as a republic, Hanzade and her family were exiled, the family moved to Paris, France and never returned.

Hanzade's father, Ömer Faruk developed an increased interest in his cousin Mihrişah Sultan, the daughter of crown prince Şehzade Yusuf Izzeddin. It was also a public knowledge that things weren't going well between Faruk and her mother Sabiha. She and her sisters sided with their mother. Faruk accused Sabiha of turning their daughters against him. But he was already in love with Mihrişah and the issue of the council was just an excuse. In 1948, after twenty-eight years of marriage, Faruk divorced Sabiha, and married Mihrişah, after which Sabiha came to Paris to live with her. After the revocation of the law of exile for princesses in 1952, her mother moved to Istanbul. Hanzade was widowed at Prince Muhammed Ali's death in 1977.

Death
Hanzade Sultan died on 19 March 1998 at the age of seventy-four in Paris, France. Her body was taken to Istanbul, and was buried on 26 March 1998 in Aşiyan Asri Cemetery.

Ancestry

References

Sources

1923 births
1998 deaths
Muhammad Ali dynasty
20th-century Ottoman princesses
20th-century Turkish women
Turkish expatriates in Switzerland
Turkish expatriates in France
Turkish expatriates in Egypt
Burials at Aşiyan Asri Cemetery